Angel Yin (born October 3, 1998) is an American professional golfer currently playing on the LPGA Tour.

Amateur career
Yin won the 7–8 year old Junior World Golf Championships, won the California State Women’s Amateur as a 12 year old and again as a 14 year old, was the youngest player at the 2011 U.S. Women's Amateur, was co-medalist at a U.S. Women's Amateur, and was the youngest player in the field at the 2012 Women’s U.S. Open (also the second youngest in history).

In 2015, she competed in the Junior Solheim Cup.

Professional
Yin posted five top-5 finishes in 2017. Her "powerful swing and ebullient personality" brought her attention from Juli Inkster, U.S. Solheim Cup captain, who named Yin as a captain's pick for the 2017 Solheim Cup. She became the youngest player on either team. She scored 1.5 points out of 3 matches. On December 9, 2017, she won the Omega Dubai Ladies Classic for her first professional victory. Yin started off the 2019 season tying for fourth in the ISPS Handa Women's Australian Open on February 27, 2019.

Personal
Yin was born and raised in Los Angeles, California. Her mother, Michelle Liu, a businesswoman who immigrated to the U.S. from China, caddied for Yin when she was still an amateur. Yin attended Arcadia High School, but finished her diploma online.

Professional wins (1)

Ladies European Tour wins (1)
2017 Omega Dubai Ladies Classic

Results in LPGA majors
Results not in chronological order before 2019 or in 2020.

^ The Evian Championship was added as a major in 2013.

CUT = missed the half-way cut
WD = withdrew
NT = no tournament
"T" = tied

Summary

Most consecutive cuts made – 4 (twice)
Longest streak of top-10s – 1 (three times)

Team appearances
Amateur
Junior Solheim Cup (representing the United States): 2015 (winners)

Professional
Solheim Cup (representing the United States): 2017 (winners), 2019

Solheim Cup record

References

External links

American female golfers
LPGA Tour golfers
Ladies European Tour golfers
Solheim Cup competitors for the United States
Golfers from Los Angeles
American sportspeople of Chinese descent
1998 births
Living people
21st-century American women
20th-century American women